Two referendums were held in Switzerland in 1969. The first was held on 1 June on a federal law on the Swiss Federal Institutes of Technology, and was rejected by 66% of voters. The second was held on 14 September 1969 on an amendment to the constitution regarding land law, and was approved by 56% of voters.

Results

June: Swiss Federal Institutes of Technology

September: Constitutional amendment on land law

References

1969 referendums
1969 in Switzerland
Referendums in Switzerland